Common names: Grand Canyon rattlesnake, canyon bleached rattlesnake.

Crotalus oreganus abyssus is a venomous pit viper subspecies found only in the U.S. states of Arizona and Utah.

Description
This is a medium to large rattlesnake. Adults measure 16–54 inches (41–137 cm) in total length.

Dorsally, they have dark blotches on a variety of base colors ranging from reddish, pink, yellow/green, light tan, to gray. The blotches usually become crossbands near the tail. The young usually have more prominent blotches and facial markings than the adults. Some adults have no body markings.

The rostral scale usually comes into contact with more than 2 internasal scales.

Geographic range
Found in northwestern and north-central Arizona along both rims and the floor of the Grand Canyon and adjacent areas,, and North into Utah on the Kaiparowits Plateau between the Escalante River and Paria River Drainages of Kane and Garfield Counties, Utah.

Habitat
The snake is found in a variety of habitats, including grassland, Great Basin Desert scrubland, bottoms in the Grand Canyon, talus and cliff slopes, rolling hills and bajadas in pinion-juniper woodland, and pine forests.

Behavior
It is primarily diurnal but can be active around the clock when conditions are favorable. The cryptic coloration and calm demeanor of this subspecies often allows it to escape detection from passersby.

Feeding
It feeds on squirrels, mice, lizards, and birds.

Taxonomy notes
Some researchers list this taxon as elevated to a full species as (Crotalus abyssus), or as a subspecies of the Great Basin Rattlesnake (Crotalus lutosus) as (Crotalus lutosus abyssus), in the Annotated Checklist of the Rattlesnakes (Second Edition), published in The Biology of Rattlesnakes II 2017.

References

Further reading
 Klauber, L.M. 1930. New and Renamed Subspecies of Crotalus confluentus Say, with Remarks on Related Species. Trans. San Diego Soc. Nat. Hist. 6 (3): 95–144, including Plates 9–12, 1 map. ("Crotalus confluentus abyssus, subsp. nov.", pp. 114–117 + Plate 11, figure 1.)

External links

 
 Images of Crotalus oreganus abyssus at California Reptiles and Amphibians. Accessed 18 June 2008.

oreganus abyssus
Reptiles of the United States
Endemic fauna of the United States
Fauna of the Southwestern United States
Natural history of the Grand Canyon